Death by Chocolate is a dessert theme involving large amounts of chocolate.

Death by Chocolate may also refer to:

Death by Chocolate (album), a 2001 album by De Phazz
Death by Chocolate:The Last Word on a Consuming Passion, a 1992 dessert cookbook by Marcel Desaulniers
"Death By Chocolate", an episode of the TV series Harvey Birdman, Attorney at Law
"Death By Chocolate", a short story from Fearsome Tales for Fiendish Kids, and its adaptation episode of the same name from Grizzly Tales for Gruesome Kids
Theobromine poisoning, also known as chocolate poisoning
Death by Chocolate, a band on Jetset Records
"Death by Chocolate", a song by Soccer Mommy from Collection